Trần Văn Chương (2 June 1898 – 24 July 1986) was South Vietnam's ambassador to the United States in the early 1960s and the father of the country's de facto first lady, Madame Nhu (1924-2011). He was also the foreign minister of the Empire of Vietnam, a Japanese puppet state that existed in 1945.

Family life
He married Thân Thị Nam Trân (died 24 July 1986), who was a member of the extended Vietnamese royal family. Her father was Thân Trọng Huề, who became Vietnam's minister for national education, and her mother was a daughter of Emperor Đồng Khánh. They had a son and three daughters, including Lệ Xuân, who became the wife of Ngô Đình Nhu, the brother of South Vietnam's first President, Ngô Đình Diệm.

Chương's family alliances enabled him to rise from being a member of a small law practice in the Cochin-Chinese (South Vietnamese) town of Bạc Liêu in the 1920s to become Vietnam's first Foreign Secretary under his wife's cousin Emperor Bảo Đại, while Japan occupied Vietnam during World War II.His wife Madame Chuong was accused by the French secret police (French Sûreté) of sleeping with Japanese diplomats so her husband was hired by them. He eventually became South Vietnam's ambassador to the United States, but resigned in protest in 1963, denouncing his government's anti-Buddhist policies.

South Vietnam coup d'état
On 1 November 1963, Chuong's son-in-law Ngô Đình Nhu and Nhu's brother, President Ngô Đình Diệm were assassinated in a coup d'état led by General Dương Văn Minh. Chuong's daughter, Ngô Đình Nhu's wife, Madame Nhu (1924-2011), was in Beverly Hills, California, at the time of the coup.

Death
Chương and his wife remained in the United States in Washington, D.C. On 24 July 1986, they were found strangled to death at their home. Their son, Trần Văn Khiêm, was accused but found unfit for trial. The remains of Chương and his wife were interred at Rock Creek Cemetery in Washington, D.C.

References

External links

"Former Saigon Envoy And Wife Found Dead"
"The Queen Bee", Time Magazine

1898 births
1986 deaths
Vietnamese people of the Vietnam War
Vietnamese people murdered abroad
Ambassadors of South Vietnam to the United States
Vietnamese expatriates in the United States
Deaths by strangulation in the United States
People murdered in Washington, D.C.
Place of birth missing
Burials at Rock Creek Cemetery